Bileddhoo (Dhivehi: ބިލެއްދޫ) is one of the inhabited islands of Faafu Atoll.

Geography

Demography

References

Islands of the Maldives